U Wisara Monument is a statue of U Wisara in Yangon, Burma. It is located directly west of the northwest corner of Kandawmingala Lake on U Wisara Road, and is located several metres southwest of the Shwedagon Pagoda. The statue was erected on August 1, 1943.

References

Buildings and structures in Yangon
Monuments and memorials in Myanmar
1943 sculptures
Buddhism in Myanmar